Tazar (also Romanized as Ţazar) is a village in Mehr Rural District, Bashtin District, Davarzan County, Razavi Khorasan Province, Iran. At the 2006 census, its population was 154, in 50 families.

References 

Populated places in Davarzan County